Solanum sodiroi is a species of plant in the family Solanaceae. It is possibly endemic to Ecuador.

S. carchiense as described by Correll is an invalid name for this plant that is sometimes still seen. Altogether, the following synonyms are assigned to this species:
 Solanum carchiense Correll
 Solanum sodiroi var. dimorphophyllum (Bitter) Correll
 Solanum sodiroi ssp. dimorphophyllum Bitter
 Solanum tetrapetalum Rusby

The mysterious S. carchiense was classified as Endangered by the IUCN before it was synonymized with the more widespread S. sodiroi.

References

Footnotes
 
  [2008]: Solanum sodiroi. Retrieved 2008-SEP-30.

sodiroi
Taxonomy articles created by Polbot
Taxobox binomials not recognized by IUCN